A Little Piece of Ground is a young adult novel by Elizabeth Laird, written with Sonia Nimr. The book is about a  twelve-year-old boy and his family struggling under the oppression of occupation in Palestine. It was first published by Macmillan in 2003 and reprinted by Haymarket Books in 2006. In 2003 it was a nominee for the Carnegie Medal and in 2004 won the Hampshire Book Award. The story comes from Laird's experiences in Lebanon during the Lebanese Civil War. The book has attracted some controversy regarding its portrayal of Israel/Palestinian relations. The book was translated into Arabic and rewritten with the Palestinian author Sonia Nimr and it was published by Tamer Institute for Community Education.

References

External links

Interview with the writer from NPR, 2003
Teaching Guide for A Little Piece of Ground
Article about A Little Piece of Ground
A Little Piece of Ground (PDF file)
Book Review at dissidentvoice.org

2003 British novels
British young adult novels
Novels set in Israel
Macmillan Publishers books